
Redondo (rounded in Spanish and Portuguese) may refer to:

Places

Philippines
Redondo Peninsula, on the island Luzon

Portugal
Redondo, Portugal, a municipality in southeastern Portugal

United States
 Redondo, Des Moines, Washington, United States
 Redondo Beach, California, formerly known as Redondo

People
 Alberto Redondo (born 1997), Spanish association football player
 Dolores Redondo (born 1969), Spanish writer
 Fernando Redondo (born 1969), Argentine association football player
 Nestor Redondo (1928–1995), Filipino comic book artist

See also
 Redonda (disambiguation)
 Redondo Beach (disambiguation)